Kyle Stanford (born 1970) is an American philosophy professor at the University of California, Irvine, who specializes in the philosophy of science.

Education and career

He earned his B.A. with Honors in Philosophy and Psychology from Northwestern University in 1991, and did his graduate work at the University of California, San Diego, earning his M.A. in Philosophy, 1994, and his Ph.D. in Philosophy/Science Studies, in 1997, under the direction of Philip Kitcher.

He joined the Department of Philosophy at the University of California, Irvine in 1997, and moved to the newly created Department of Logic and Philosophy of Science there in 1998, earning tenure in 2004.  He has been a visiting professor in the History and Philosophy of Science department at the University of Pittsburgh in Spring 2009.

Selected publications

Notes and references

External links
Kyle Stanford website via UC Irvine.

1970 births
Living people
20th-century American philosophers
21st-century American philosophers
Philosophers of science
University of California, Irvine faculty
American non-fiction writers
Northwestern University alumni
University of California, San Diego alumni